James Horace Kemp (18 August 1912 – 5 December 1983) was an American labor organizer and elected president of the NAACP. He was married to Maida Springer Kemp, a labor organizer and historian. He served on the executive board of the Chicago Federation of Labor. He was also a board member of the Regional Transportation Authority.

Legacy
 METX 105, an EMD F40PH locomotive owned by Metra is named after James Kemp (because he was on the board of directors of the Regional Transit Authority, which oversees Metra). It entered service with Metra in 1977 and was the sixth F40PH to be delivered into their fleet. It currently serves the BNSF Line out of Chicago Union Station.

References 

1912 births
1983 deaths
Chicago Federation of Labor people
NAACP activists
Place of birth missing
Place of death missing
African-American trade unionists
20th-century African-American people